Hordaland was a county in Norway, bordering Sogn og Fjordane, Buskerud, Telemark, and Rogaland counties. Hordaland was the third largest county, after Akershus and Oslo, by population. The county government was the Hordaland County Municipality, which is located in Bergen. Before 1972, the city of Bergen was its own separate county, apart from Hordaland. On 1 January 2020, the county was merged with neighbouring Sogn og Fjordane county, to form the new Vestland county.

Name and symbols

Name 
Hordaland (Old Norse: Hǫrðaland) is the old name of the region which was revived in 1919. The first element is the plural genitive case of hǫrðar, the name of an old Germanic tribe (see Charudes). The last element is land which means "land" or "region" in the Norwegian language.

Until 1919 the name of the county was Søndre Bergenhus amt which meant "(the) southern (part of) Bergenhus amt". (The old Bergenhus amt was created in 1662 and was divided into Northern and Southern parts in 1763.)

Flag 

Hordaland's flag shows two golden axes and a crown in red. The flag is a banner of the coat of arms derived from the old seal of the guild of St. Olav from Onarheim in Tysnes municipality. This seal was used by the delegates of Sunnhordland in 1344 on the document to install king Haakon V of Norway. It was thus the oldest symbol used for the region and adapted as the arms and flag in 1961. The symbols refer to the patron saint of the guild, Saint Olav, King of Norway, whose symbol is an axe.

Coat of arms 
The coat-of-arms were officially granted on 1 December 1961.  They were designed by Magnus Hardeland, but the general design had been originally used in the Sunnhordland region during the 14th century.  In the early 20th century, leaders of the county began using the old arms as a symbol for the county once again.  The arms are on a red background and consist of two golden axes that are crossed with a golden crown above them.

History 
{{Historical populations
|footnote = Source: Statistics Norway.
|shading  = off
|align = left
|1769|63757
|1900|205771
|1950|308164
|1960|338265
|1970|369430
|1980|388084
|1990|407427
|2000|435219
|2010|477175
|2014|508500
}}

Hordaland county had been around for more than one thousand years.  In the 7th century, the area was made up of many petty kingdoms under the Gulating and was known as Hordafylke from around the year 900. In the early 16th century, Norway was divided into four len.  The Bergenhus len was headquartered in Bergen and encompassed much of western and northern Norway.

In 1662, the lens were replaced by amts.  Bergenhus amt originally consisted of the present-day areas of Hordaland, Sogn og Fjordane, and Sunnmøre and the far northern Nordlandene amt was subordinate to Bergenhus.  In the 1680s, Nordlandene and Sunnmøre were split from Bergenhus. In 1763, the amt was divided into northern and southern parts: Nordre Bergenhus amt and Søndre Bergenhus amt.  When the amt was split, the present day municipality of Gulen was split with the southern part ending up in Søndre Bergenhus amt.  In 1773, the border was re-drawn so that all of Gulen was located in the northern part.  Søndre Bergenhus amt was renamed Hordaland fylke in 1919.

The city of Bergen was classified as a city-county (byamt) from 1831 to 1972.  During that time in 1915, the municipality of Årstad was annexed into Bergen.  In 1972, the neighbouring municipalities of Arna, Fana, Laksevåg and Åsane were annexed into the city of Bergen.  Also at that same time, the city of Bergen lost its county status, and became a part of Hordaland county.

 Government 

A county (fylke) is the chief local administrative area in Norway. The whole country is divided into 19 counties. A county is also an election area, with popular votes taking place every 4 years.  In Hordaland, the government of the county was the Hordaland County Municipality.  It included 57 members elected to form a county council (Fylkesting). Heading the Fylkesting was the county mayor (fylkesordførar). The last county mayor for the Hordaland County Municipality was Anne Gine Hestetun.

The county also had a County Governor (fylkesmann) who was the representative of the King and Government of Norway. Lars Sponheim was the last County Governor of Hordaland.
The municipalities in Hordaland were divided among four district courts (tingrett): Nordhordland, Sunnhordland, Bergen, and Hardanger. Hordaland was also part of the Gulating Court of Appeal district based in Bergen.
 Nordhordland District Court: Askøy, Austevoll, Austrheim, Fedje, Fjell, Fusa, Lindås, Masfjorden, Meland, Modalen, Os, Osterøy, Radøy, Samnanger, Sund, Vaksdal, Voss, Øygarden, and Gulen (Gulen was actually in neighbouring Sogn og Fjordane county)
 Sunnhordland District Court: Bømlo, Etne, Fitjar, Kvinnherad, Stord, Sveio and Tysnes
 Bergen District Court: the city of Bergen
 Hardanger District Court: Eidfjord, Granvin, Jondal, Kvam, Odda, Ullensvang and Ulvik

Most of the municipalities in Hordaland were part of the Hordaland police district. Gulen and Solund in Sogn og Fjordane county were also part of the Hordaland police district. Bømlo, Etne, Fitjar, Stord and Sveio were a part of the "Haugaland and Sunnhordland"'' police district, along with eight other municipalities in Rogaland county.

Geography 

Hordaland is semi-circular in shape. It is located on the western coast of Norway, split from southwest to northeast by the long, deep Hardangerfjorden, one of Norway's main fjords and a great tourist attraction. About half of the National park of Hardangervidda is in this county. The county also includes many well-known waterfalls, such as Vøringsfossen and Stykkjedalsfossen. It also includes the Folgefonna and Hardangerjøkulen glaciers.

More than 60% of the inhabitants live in Bergen and the surrounding area. Other urban or semi-urban centres include Leirvik, Voss and Odda.

Municipalities

 Askøy
 Austevoll
 Austrheim
 Bergen
 Bømlo
 Eidfjord
 Etne
 Fedje
 Fitjar
 Fjell
 Fusa
 Granvin
 Jondal
 Kvam
 Kvinnherad
 Lindås
 Masfjorden
 Meland
 Modalen
 Odda
 Os 
 Osterøy
 Øygarden
 Radøy
 Samnanger
 Stord
 Sund
 Sveio
 Tysnes
 Ullensvang
 Ulvik
 Vaksdal
 Voss

Districts

 Hardanger
 Haugaland
 Mauranger
 Midhordland
 Nordhordland
 Stril
 Strilelandet
 Sunnhordland
 Voss

Cities

 Bergen
 Leirvik
 Odda

Parishes

 Alversund
 Arna
 Ask
 Askøy
 Austevoll
 Austrheim
 Bekkjarvik
 Bergen
 Bergsdalen
 Birkeland
 Biskopshavn
 Bjoastrand
 Blomvåg
 Bremnes
 Bruvik
 Bømlo
 Old Bømlo
 Bønes
 Dale
 Eid
 Eidfjord
 Old Eidfjord
 Eidsvåg
 Eksingedal
 Emigrant
 Erdal
 Etne
 Evanger
 Fana
 Fedje
 Finnås
 Fitjar
 Fjelberg
 Fjell
 Fjæra
 Foldnes
 Førde
 Fridalen
 Frøyset
 Fusa
 Fyllingsdalen
 Gjerde
 Gjerstad
 Granvin
 Grindheim
 Haga
 Hamre
 Hatlestrand
 Haus
 Herdla (Herlø)
 Hjelme
 Old Hjelme
 Holdhus
 Holmedal
 Holy Cross
 Hordabø (Bøe)
 Hosanger
 Hundvin
 Hundvåkøy
 Husnes
 Hålandsdal
 Jondal
 Kausland
 Kinsarvik
 Knarvik
 Kvam
 Kvinnherad
 Laksevåg
 Landro
 Landås
 Lindås
 Loddefjord
 Lygra
 Lykling
 Manger
 Masfjorden
 Meland
 Mjelde
 Mo
 Moster 
 Old Moster
 Myking
 Møkster
 Nesheim
 Nore Neset Church
 Norheimsund
 Nygård
 Nykirken
 Nysæter
 Odda
 Olsvik
 Onarheim
 Opdal (Uggdal)
 Oppheim
 Os
 Ostereidet
 Raundalen
 Reksteren
 Røldal (before 1848 in Rogaland)
 Salhus
 Samnanger
 Sandnes
 Sandvik
 Seim
 Skare
 Skjold
 Skånevik
 Slettebakken
 Solheim, Bergen
 Solheim, Masfjorden
 St James's
 St George's
 St John's
 St Mark's
 St Mary's
 Stamnes
 Stord
 Store-Kalsøy
 Storetveit
 Strandebarm
 Strandvik
 Strudshavn
 Strusshamn
 Stødle
 Støle (Strødle)
 Sund
 Sundvor
 Sveio
 Sæbø
 Sælen
 Søreide
 Takvam
 Tveit
 Tysnes
 Tyssedal
 Uggdal
 Ullensvang
 Ulvik
 Uppheim
 Uskedalen
 Utne
 Vaksdal
 Valen
 Valen
 Valestrand
 Varaldsøy
 Vikw
 Vikebygd
 Vikøy
 Vinje
 Voss
 Vossestrand
 Ytre Arna
 Ytrebygda
 Ænes
 Ølen
 Ølve
 Øystese
 Åkra (Åkre)
 Ålvik
 Årstad
 Åsane

Villages

 Abbedisso
 Algrøyna
 Alsåker
 Alveim
 Alver
 Alverstraumen
 Ask
 Askeland, Lindås
 Askeland, Radøy
 Auklandshamn (Økland)
 Austbygdi
 Austevollhella
 Austmarka
 Austrepollen
 Austrheim
 Bakkasund
 Bekkjarvik
 Birkeland
 Blomvåg
 Bolstadøyri
 Borstrondi
 Botnen
 Breistein
 Bru (Strandebarm)
 Bruvik
 Bøvågen
 Dale (Dalekvam)
 Dalegarden
 Dimmelsvik
 Djønno
 Eidfjord
 Eidsvik
 Eikelandsosen
 Eitrheim
 Erdal
 Espeland
 Etnesjøen (Etne)
 Evanger
 Fanahammeren (Fana)
 Fedje
 Finse
 Fitjar
 Fjelberg
 Fjell
 Fjæra
 Flatkvål
 Flesland
 Foldnes
 Fotlandsvåg
 Frekhaug
 Fusa
 Fyllingsdalen
 Førde i Hordaland
 Gjermundshamn Ferry Port
 Gjetingsdalen
 Granvin
 Grov
 Haga
 Hagavik
 Haljem
 Hammarsland
 Hamre
 Hanevik
 Hatlestrand
 Haugland
 Haukanes
 Haus
 Havrå
 Helle
 Hernar
 Herøysund
 Hjartås
 Hjellestad
 Holdhus
 Holme
 Holmefjord
 Horda
 Hosanger
 Hundvin
 Husa
 Husavik
 Husnes
 Hylkje
 Høylandsbygda
 Indre Arna
 Indre Ålvik
 Io
 Isdalstø
 Jondal
 Kaland
 Kausland
 Kinsarvik
 Kjøkkelvik
 Kleppestø
 Klokkarvik
 Knappskog
 Knarrevik
 Knarrevik (Knarvrika)
 Kolbeinsvik
 Kolltveit
 Krokeidet
 Krossneset
 Kvitheim
 Kysnesstranda
 Laksevåg
 Landro
 Langevåg
 Lindås
 Litlabø
 Loddefjord
 Lofthus
 Lonevåg
 Luro
 Lykling
 Manger
 Masfjordnes
 Mathopen
 Meland
 Milde
 Misje
 Mo (Modalen)
 Mongstad
 Moster
 Mosterhamn
 Møvik
 Mundheim
 Møkster
 Nedre Vinjo
 Nesheim
 Nesttun
 Nord-Huglo
 Nordrepollen
 Nordvik
 Norheimsund
 Onarheim
 Osa
 Ostereidet
 Osøyro
 Reksteren
 Ringøy
 Rong
 Rosendal
 Rossland
 Rostøy
 Rubbestadneset
 Røldal
 Sagvåg
 Salhus
 Seim
 Sekkingstad
 Seljestad
 Skare (Skarde)
 Skjelviki
 Skogsvåg
 Skånevik
 Sletta
 Stalheim
 Stamneshella
 Stanghelle
 Steine
 Storebø
 Strandvik
 Straume
 Strusshamn
 Sundal
 Sunde i Sunnhordland
 Sveio
 Svortland
 Sylta
 Sæbø (Sæbøvågen)
 Sæbøvik
 Søfteland
 Søre Øyane
 Sør-Huglo
 Søvik
 Toska
 Trengereid
 Tunes
 Turøyna
 Tveitevåg
 Tysse
 Tyssedal
 Tælavåg
 Tørvikbygd
 Uggdal
 Uggdalseidet
 Ulvik
 Uskedal
 Utne
 Utsylta
 Utåker
 Valen
 Valestrand
 Valestrandfossen
 Valevåg
 Vaksdal
 Varaldsøy
 Vikadal
 Vikavågen
 Vikebygd
 Vikøy
 Vinnes
 Vossevangen
 Våga
 Våge
 Våge
 Ytre Arna
 Ytre Ålvik
 Ænes
 Ølve
 Øvre Eidfjord
 Øystese
 Ågotnes
 Åkra
 Årland
 Årland
 Årås

Former municipalities

 Alversund
 Arna
 Bergen landdistrikt
 Bremnes
 Bruvik
 Eid
 Evanger
 Fana
 Finnås
 Fjelberg
 Hamre
 Haus
 Herdla
 Hjelme
 Hordabø
 Hosanger
 Hålandsdal
 Kinsarvik
 Laksevåg
 Manger
 Moster
 Mosterøy
 Røldal
 Skånevik
 Strandebarm
 Strandvik
 Sæbø
 Valestrand
 Varaldsøy
 Vikebygd
 Vossestrand
 Ølen
 Årstad
 Åsane

International relations

Twin towns – Sister cities 
Hordaland county is twinned with:
  Lower Normandy, France
  Kaunas, Lithuania
  Cardiff, Wales
  Orkney Islands, Northern Isles, Scotland

Christmas Tree 
Since 1949 Hordaland has given a Christmas tree to the Scottish Capital city of Edinburgh this is to remember the help given to Norwegians during World War II by Scots however since 2008 the tree has been sourced in Scotland but has remained a gift from the people of Hordaland.

Notable residents 
 Ole Bull (1810–1880), composer, violinist
 Tore Eikeland (1990–2011), politician
 Edvard Grieg (1843–1907), composer
 Nordahl Grieg (1902–1943), writer
 C. J. Hambro (1885–1964), politician
 Julius Christopher Hammer (1798–1877). priest and politician
 Ludvig Holberg (1684–1754), writer
 Leif Andreas Larsen ("Shetlands-Larsen") (1906–1990), military officer in World War II
 Christian Michelsen (1857–1925), politician
 Johan Sebastian Welhaven (1807–1873), writer
 Kyrre Gørvell-Dahll (1991-presents), DJ, musician
 Alan Olav Walker (1997- presents), DJ, musician

References

External links 

 County web site
 Map of Hordaland

 
Former counties of Norway
History of Vestland
2020 disestablishments in Norway
States and territories disestablished in 2020